Royal Air Force Strubby or more simply RAF Strubby is a former Royal Air Force station  north of Alford, Lincolnshire, and  south east of Louth, Lincolnshire, England.

History

Squadrons

Units
 No. 381 Maintenance Unit RAF (MU)
 No. 382 MU
 No. 383 MU
 No. 384 MU
 Empire Air Armament School RAF
 RAF College of Air Warfare
 RAF Flying College
 5 Group Anti-Aircraft School
 12 GCA Unit

Current use
Woodthorpe Hall Caravan and Leisure Park currently occupies a small section of the site.

Lincs Aquatics trades from one of the old hangers. 

Lincolnshire Gliding Club (formerly Strubby Gliding Club) has operated from the site since 1978. Celebrations to mark the club's 40th anniversary at Strubby were held in summer 2018. Gliders here make use of long runways of both grass and asphalt surfaces.
There is also a small airfield with an asphalt runway on the northern side of the site.

See also
 List of former Royal Air Force stations

References

Citations

Bibliography

Gliderports in the United Kingdom
Royal Air Force stations in Lincolnshire